The Plateau shiner (Cyprinella lepida) is a species of fish in the family Cyprinidae. It is endemic to the United States,  where it occurs on the Edwards Plateau in Texas where it inhabits the upper Guadalupe and Nueces River drainages.

References

Cyprinella
Taxa named by Charles Frédéric Girard
Fish described in 1856